Jeffrey R. Chessani (born December 26, 1963) is a retired Lieutenant Colonel in the United States Marine Corps, and was the commanding officer 3rd Battalion, 1st Marines during the November 2005 urban combat in Haditha, Iraq. In that event, known as the Haditha killings, marines in his battalion were accused of having killed 20 civilians while pursuing insurgents.

The Naval Criminal Investigative Service was called in to investigate the killings after Time magazine published a report on the killings.
Thirteen months passed between the killings, and the initiation of the NCIS inquiry.

Chessani was removed along with Captains Luke McConnell and 10-years-veteran James Kimber (born 1973), However, all criminal charges against Chessani were dismissed. A Board of Inquiry found that there was no misconduct even though the lower standard of proving guilt, preponderance of the evidence, was applied instead of reasonable doubt.

The Thomas More Law Center along with national radio host Michael Savage defended Chessani against the charge that he failed to investigate the killings. Staff Sergeant Frank Wuterich was the senior marine on patrol and is under investigation for other charges. To date, after numerous trials, no marines have been found guilty of committing any crimes.

Chessani, 45, was raised in the small town of Rangely, Colorado, where he graduated from high school in 1982. He went on to receive a B.A. from the University of Northern Colorado in 1988. During his military career he  participated in the 1989 Operation Just Cause (Invasion of Panama), the 1991 Gulf War (Operation Desert Storm), and most recently the Iraq War (Operation Iraqi Freedom).

On June 17, 2008 Military Judge Colonel Steven Folsom dismissed all charges against Chessani on the grounds that General James Mattis, who approved the filing of the charges against him, had been improperly influenced by an investigator probing the incident. The ruling was without prejudice, which allowed the prosecution to refile.

In 2008 an appeal filed on behalf of the Marine Corps, claiming that the judge abused his power when he dismissed dereliction of duty charges against Chessani in killings. On March 17, 2009, a military appeals court upheld the dismissal of the war crimes charges against Chessani.

Chessani’s commanding general, Major General Huck, reported up the chain of command, "I support our account and do not see the necessity for further investigation." Huck was allowed to retire without loss of rank, and without going to a Board of Inquiry.

On Friday, August 28, 2009, the new general in charge of Chessani’s case, LtGen George Flynn, Commanding General of the Marine Corps Combat Development Command in Quantico, VA, decided that criminal charges were not warranted. Instead, he ordered Chessani to face a Navy administrative procedure, called a Board of Inquiry, which found no misconduct and recommended that he be allowed to retire without loss of rank.

Richard Thompson, President and Chief Counsel of the Thomas More Law Center, said, "The government’s persecution of this loyal Marine officer continues because he refused to throw his men under the bus to appease some anti-war politicians and press, and the Iraqi government. Any punishment of LtCol Chessani handed down by a Board of Inquiry would be a miscarriage of justice because he did nothing wrong, and our lawyers will mount the same vigorous defense in this administrative proceeding as they did in the criminal."

The dismissed allegations against Chessani were for failing to properly report and investigate the November 19, 2005 incident. The evidence shows instead that he had immediately reported the deaths of the 15 civilian Iraqis to his superiors, and not one of his superiors — including top generals— considered it unusual or ordered a further investigation. Instead, they commended him for a job well done. In fact, Chessani’s immediate superior told him that no investigation was needed because it was a bona fide combat action— which was consistent with the orders in effect at the time, there were: no investigation of civilian deaths related to combat action. That order was changed in April, 2006, well after the Haditha incident.

Chessani retired from the Corps on July 16, 2010.

See also

Haditha killings
Command responsibility

Notes

External links
Thomas More Law Center

1963 births
Living people
United States Marine Corps personnel of the Gulf War
United States Marine Corps personnel of the Iraq War
People from Rangely, Colorado
University of Northern Colorado alumni
United States Marine Corps officers